Elizabeth Russell (1754-1823) was a Gibraltarian-born English diarist who settled in Upper Canada, with her half-brother, Peter Russell, the Province's first Receiver General.

Life
Russell was born into a disrupted family. Her father Richard Russell was cashiered over a scandal, and, according to the Dictionary of Canadian Biography, the stress drove her mother "violently insane". While he was able to secure employment with the Royal Navy in Harwich, the Dictionary reported "Elizabeth grew up with little education, in an atmosphere darkened by her mother’s insanity and her father’s debts, extravagance, ill health, and lawsuits."

Russell's father was alienated from her much older half=brother Peter, so she did not meet him until she was 17 years old, and he was 38. Russell cared for her elderly parents until her father died in 1786, when she moved in with Peter, at 31 years old. Neither ever married. The Dictionary of Canadian Biography suggestively described them as a "devoted couple for the rest of their lives." It would have been more appropriate to describe them as a "devoted pair".

In 1791, Peter was appointed Receiver General of Upper Canada. When his superior John Graves Simcoe fell ill, Russell was appointed the temporary administrator of Upper Canada, his title "President", while Simcoe returned to England. Peter had hoped to be appointed Simcoe's replacement, but he continued to be merely the administrator for three years. Peter continued to be part of the Provincial administration when Peter Hunter was appointed the second Lieutenant Governor in 1799.

He would have liked to have liquidated his landholdings, and retired to England as he became older and his health failed, but there was little market for property in an era when the Crown was granting free land to amyone deemed worthy.

Peter died in 1808. He left his entire estate to Elizabeth.

Peter and Elizabeth were slave owners, owning Peggy Pompadour, and her children Amy, Milly and Jupiter. It is not known when they purchased Peggy and her children, but most likely from Loyalists while living in Niagara during the first years of the Upper Canadian government. Simcoe's act to limit slavery prohibited importing new slaves; it did not affect the slavery of individuals in captivity from prior to its imposition. They tried, several times, to sell the Pompadour family, due to their troubled relations with them, without success. Amy is said to have been given to John Denison's wife or daughter.

According to the Dictionary of Canadian Biography, after Peter's death, Elizabeth relied on the family of Dr. William Warren Baldwin. She found the War of 1812 troubling, and she began to show signs of mental instability. By 1814, members of the Baldwin family moved in with her, to help care for her.

She would leave her considerable estate to her cousins Maria Willcocks (spinster) and Phoebe Willcocks, wife of Dr. Baldwin. After Maria's death the entire estate ended up in Baldwin's control, and eventually in the hands of his heirs.

In late 2018 Afua Cooper published excerpts from Russell's diary, in which she described Peggy and her children.

References

1754 births
1822 deaths
Canadian slave owners
Upper Canada people
Women slave owners
18th-century Canadian businesspeople